Notre-Dame-des-Sept-Douleurs (meaning "Our Lady of the Seven Sorrows") is an island municipality in the Bas-Saint-Laurent region of Quebec, Canada, part of the Rivière-du-Loup Regional County Municipality. The name Île Verte was given in 1621 by Samuel de Champlain written "Isle Verte".

With a population of only 71 persons, Notre-Dame-des-Sept-Douleurs is one of the smallest municipalities in Canada. It is home to the oldest lighthouse in Quebec (built in 1809).

The main economic activities are fishing and tourism. Many fish smokehouses are present on the island. In addition to the oldest lighthouse in Quebec, its pastoral character, skeleton museum, many artists and heritage homes also attract tourists.

Geography 

History

The island was first mentioned in the Jesuit Reports of 1663 following a shipwreck which forced Henri Nouvel to stay there for about ten days.

On 10 June 1816, half the Nova Scotia Fencibles, some 210 officers and other ranks, together with 48 wives and children, were on board the Archduke Charles when it wrecked near Green Island.  Four soldiers, two wives, and two children lost their lives.

In 1874, the municipality was formed out of the parish of La Décollation-de-Saint-Jean-Baptiste on November 18, which led to its name "Notre-Dame-des-Sept-Douleurs" since this date corresponded to the Day of Our Lady of Sorrows on the liturgical calendar at that time. However the municipality only existed on paper. The community formed in isolation and life on the island was governed by traditional customs, so people had little need for municipal management, which would have been a family affair anyway. Finally on February 5, 1912, the first council meeting took place.

Today, the biggest family to occupy the Island is the Fraser of Scottish Canadian descent.

Demographics 

Mother tongue (2021):
 English as first language: 0%
 French as first language: 100%
 English and French as first language: 0%
 Other as first language: 0%

See also
 List of parish municipalities in Quebec

References

External links 

Incorporated places in Bas-Saint-Laurent
Parish municipalities in Quebec